The Center for Jewish History is a partnership of five Jewish history, scholarship, and art organizations in New York City: American Jewish Historical Society, American Sephardi Federation, Leo Baeck Institute New York, Yeshiva University Museum, and YIVO Institute for Jewish Research. Together, housed in one location, the partners have separate governing bodies and finances, but collocate resources. The partners' collections make up the biggest repository of Jewish history in the United States. The Center for Jewish History also serves as a centralized place of scholarly research, events, exhibitions, and performances. Located within the center are the Lillian Goldman Reading Room, Ackman & Ziff Family Genealogy Institute and a Collection Management & Conservation Wing. The Center for Jewish History is also an affiliate of the Smithsonian Institution.

History 

In 2000, the center was opened after six years of construction and planning with a goal of creating synergy among the five member organizations, each offering a different approach to Jewish history, scholarship and art. This was one of the first attempts at uniting differing views on Jewish culture and resulted in the largest repository documenting the Jewish experience outside of Israel leading some to refer to it as the Jewish Library of Congress.

In the late 1980s, Bruce Slovin, who was the chairman of YIVO, originated the concept of a unified center where the partners could share resources. The idea was triggered when he realized that the then home of YIVO, a mansion located at 86th and Fifth Avenue, was not able to meet the needs of its collections or visitors, resulting in an environment that was hazardous to the collection (it was not temperature-controlled) as well as made archival study difficult. The location on Museum Mile was not seen as an advantageous adjacency. Slovin saw YIVO and the partner organizations as being more academic-focused.

The Leo Baeck Institute was previously located at 129 East 73rd Street, and the American Jewish Historical Society, which had previously been a New York City-based institution prior to the early 1960s, was then located near Brandeis University in Waltham, Massachusetts. The Yeshiva University Museum was located in the Washington Heights neighborhood uptown.

When it opened its doors to the public in October 2000, the center struggled with financial problems. In 2007, there were preliminary talks about a partnership with NYU's Skirball Department for Hebrew and Judaic Studies to the benefit of both organizations. In the end, the center and Skirball decided not to move forward. In 2010, the Center for Jewish History was able to raise $30 million to retire its construction debt. The amount was raised and donated by the chairman and founder of the center, Bruce Slovin; co-chairmen William Ackman and Joseph Steinberg; the Fairholme Foundation; and 19 other donors. These efforts meant that the center was debt-free. In 2012, the center received a top rating of four stars from the Charity Navigator non-profit evaluation service.

In 2013, the Lillian Goldman Charitable Trust awarded the center a $1.5 million grant to establish a reference services division.

Facilities 

The center is located in Manhattan's Union Square neighborhood, and is a four-building  campus built around a courtyard that has a central entrance on 16th Street. The center is made up of four previously existing buildings and two new buildings. The buildings are the former location of the American Foundation for the Blind/Helen Keller Institute. The cost of the complex was $4.4 million.

Collections 
The partners' collections include more than 100 million documents, 500,000 books, thousands of art objects, textiles, ritual objects, music, films, and photographs. most of which had been poorly housed in the member institutions and were at risk of damage or destruction. The center is heavily involved with the preservation of records that define moments in Jewish immigration to New York City. A $670,000 grant awarded in 2007 helped with the cataloging of these materials.

Partner collection highlights 
 Original handwritten copy of Emma Lazarus' 1883 "Give me your tired, your poor" poem that was later inscribed on the base of the Statue of Liberty
 Sandy Koufax's Brooklyn Dodgers jersey
 Letter from Thomas Jefferson to New York's oldest Jewish congregation
 First Hebrew prayer books printed in America

The collections range from the early modern era in Europe and pre-colonial times in the Americas to present-day materials from across the globe. The center provides access to a comprehensive collection of historic archival materials, including Franz Kafka, Theodor Herzl, Moses Mendelssohn, Sigmund Freud and Albert Einstein. In addition to historical documents like the 1478 record of the trial of Simon of Trent, the center also includes holdings of artwork by Max Lieberman as well as Jewish ephemera like philosopher Moses Mendelssohn's eyeglasses.

Digital initiatives 
 In 2011, the Center for Jewish History began a 2-year project called, "Illuminating Hidden Collections at the Center for Jewish History," with a $229,600 grant from the Council on Library and Information Resources
 In 2013, the Center for Jewish History donated 600 images to the Google Art Project, which is part of the Google Cultural Institute, an initiative that puts cultural material online. The center was one of four New York City-based institutions to donate at that time, joining eight others. The images are very high resolution and include rich metadata.

References

External links 

 Center for Jewish History
 Center for Jewish History at Google Art Project

Chelsea, Manhattan
Jewish-American history
Jewish history organizations
Jewish museums in New York City
Jews and Judaism in Manhattan
Language regulators
Museums established in 2000
Museums in Manhattan
Society museums in New York (state)
Yeshiva University
Yiddish culture in New York (state)
History museums in New York City